William Handy Ludlow (April 2, 1821 Yonkers, Westchester County, New York – September 26, 1890 Oakdale, Suffolk County, New York) was an American politician. He also served as officer in the Union Army during the American Civil War.

Early life
Ludlow was born on April 2, 1821 in Yonkers, Westchester County, New York.  He was the son of Ezra Ludlow (1786–1861) and Rachel Seguine (1788–1864), who wed in Staten Island on February 6, 1808.  His father was the architect and builder of the University of the City of New York building.

He was a direct descendant of Roger Ludlow (1590–1664), who was elected Deputy Governor of the Massachusetts Bay Colony and Lt. Governor of Connecticut and was the first in the family to settle in North America.  His paternal grandfather, Obadiah Ludlow (Ludlam), an officer of the New Jersey troops during the American Revolution, was George Washington's right hand man throughout the War.  Dr. Charles Stedman Bull was the son of Ludlow's first cousin, Henry King Bull.  Ludlow's 4th Great-grandfather, William Ludlam Sr.(1605-1665), arrived in Southampton, Long Island about 1653.  Ludlam's will is the first recorded will in New York City history.

Ludlow graduated from New York University.

Career
He was a Democratic member from Suffolk County of the New York State Assembly in 1853 during the 76th New York State Legislature.  During that session, Ludlow was elected Speaker of the Assembly with 85 votes against 39 for Jeremiah Ellsworth, the Whig candidate.  During his time as Speaker, Gov. Horatio Seymour vetoed the "Bill for Extension of the Basis of Banking Capital."

In 1854, he ran for Lieutenant Governor of New York on the ticket with Horatio Seymour, but was defeated.

He was a delegate to the 1860 Democratic National Convention.

War service 
He joined the 73rd New York Volunteer Infantry as a 2nd lieutenant, and was soon attached to the staff of Major General John Adams Dix, and was promoted to lieutenant colonel and aide-de-camp to the general.

At the end of the Civil War, he was the agent for exchange of prisoners at Fort Monroe, Virginia, and was brevetted brigadier general and major general, US Volunteers, on March 13, 1865 for "faithful and meritorious services during the war".

Later career
In 1866, he was appointed as part of the State Central Committee for the State of New York to the National Union State Central Committee, representing Suffolk County.  Despite his retirement from politics, he continued to attend political events.

After the war, starting in 1868, he served as president of the Tontine Life Insurance Company of New York.

Personal life
On December 9, 1841 married Frances Louisa Nicoll (1822–1887), daughter of William Nicoll (1798–1823) and Sarah Greenly, heiress of the Nicoll estate around Islip on Long Island, New York.  They were the parents of six children, including:

 Nicoll Ludlow (1842–1915), an Admiral with the Navy who was married to Frances Mary Thomas (1842–1873) and Mary McLean Ludlow (1846–1915).
 William Ludlow (1843–1901), who married Genevieve Almira Sprigg (1842–1926), daughter of James Rolfe Sprigg, on January 23, 1866.
 Newton Perkins Ludlow (1846–1858), who died young.
 Francis Lewis Ludlow (b. 1850)
 Louise Nicoll Ludlow (1866–1947)

In 1889, he sold "Oakdale Farm", a  estate, to Frederick Gilbert Bourne.

Ludlow died on September 26, 1890 in Oakdale, Suffolk County, New York.

References

Sources
 Long Island Maritime Museum
 History of the Nicoll estate
 Bio of his son William
 Long Island Genealogy

1821 births
1890 deaths
New York University alumni
Speakers of the New York State Assembly
Members of the New York State Assembly
People from Yonkers, New York
People from Oakdale, New York
19th-century American politicians
Union Army officers